French lavender may refer to at least two species of plants in the genus Lavandula:

Lavandula dentata (French or fringed lavender)
Lavandula stoechas (French or Spanish lavender)